Quinta das Lágrimas is a quinta in Coimbra. It was classified in 1977 as an "Imóvel de Interesse Publico" (En: Building of Public Interest) by the IPPAR. It includes 12 ha (29.6 acres) of gardens and a palace that has been converted into a luxury hotel.

History

The origin of the estate is uncertain.  It is known that it was a hunting ground for the Portuguese royal family and that it later belonged to the University of Coimbra and afterwards to a religious order. It was acquired by the Osório Cabral de Castro family in 1730, by whose order the palace was built. In 1879 a large part of the palace was lost during a fire. It was rebuilt in the late nineteenth century by Miguel Osório Cabral de Castro, in a style different from that of the original.

Building

The palace building has a central body and two lateral ones. The lateral bodies feature a balcony with a railing of square columns on their façade. To the right there is a chapel.

The "Fonte das Lágrimas"  (En: Fountain of Tears), which according to legend originated from the tears shed by Inês de Castro when she was killed, is located close to the spring identified by António de Vasconcelos. Its entry features a broken arch, probably from the fourteenth century.

Legend and haunting
The name Quinta das Lágrimas ("quinta" meaning "estate", "lágrimas" meaning "tears"; "The Estate of Tears") comes from the legend of Prince Pedro and his bride's lady-in-waiting Inês de Castro who had a forbidden royal love affair for many years, starting in 1340. The tryst ended in 1355 when Pedro's father, King Alonso IV, who suspected Inês and her family to have designs for his throne orders his henchmen to stab her to death. But unbeknownst to the king, when Pedro's wife died from childbirth, he secretly married Inês, who by law, was the Queen of Portugal. After his father's death, Pedro became King of Portugal in 1357, and ordered the men responsible for his beloved's murder to be killed. He also wanted the courtiers to acknowledge her as their new queen and had Inês' body buried in a royal tomb. But the story takes a chilling turn when King Pedro ordered that Inês' body was exhumed and put on the throne beside him for the entire court to swear allegiance to their queen. They had to bend their knee before her decaying corpse and kiss her hand.

The fountain, "Fonte Das Lágrimas", stands on the property where Inês was slain and supposedly her blood still stains its stone bottom that was born of her tears. For centuries, the estate is reportedly haunted by the ghost of Inês, who is heard crying on the grounds. Also, the legend has it that Inês' spirit still roams the estate, eternally searching for her lost love, Pedro.

References

Buildings and structures in Coimbra
Palaces in Portugal